Lukas Königshofer (born 16 March 1989) is an Austrian professional footballer who plays as a goalkeeper.

Club career

Since his contract with Rapid Wien expired in summer 2014, Königshofer went for trial sessions at Hallescher FC in May of that year. On 29 July 2014, it was announced that he had signed for Halle on a two-year contract.

Personal life
His father Roland Königshofer is a former Olympic cyclist.

References

External links
Lukas Königshofer at Kicker

1989 births
Living people
Association football goalkeepers
Austrian footballers
Austria youth international footballers
Austria under-21 international footballers
Footballers from Vienna
Austrian Football Bundesliga players
3. Liga players
Regionalliga players
SK Rapid Wien players
SK Austria Kärnten players
FC Kärnten players
Hallescher FC players
Stuttgarter Kickers players
SpVgg Unterhaching players
KFC Uerdingen 05 players
Austrian expatriate footballers
Expatriate footballers in Germany
Austrian expatriate sportspeople in Germany